Brown Cyclopaedia is the debut album of Pelt, released in 1995 through Radioactive Rat Records.

Track listing

Personnel 
Pelt
Patrick Best – instruments
Mike Gangloff – vocals, instruments
Jack Rose – instruments
Production and additional personnel
James Connell – instruments on "Who Is The Third Who Walks Always Beside You?", "Speedy West Massaker" and "Hugest"
Mark Cornick – instruments
Ron Curry – instruments on "4th in Paradise" and "Total Denigration"
Paul Morabito – instruments on "Who Is The Third Who Walks Always Beside You?", "Speedy West Massaker" and "Hugest"

References

External links 
 

1995 debut albums
Pelt (band) albums
VHF Records albums